Syllitus argillaceus is a species of beetle in the family Cerambycidae. It was described by McKeown in 1937.

References

Stenoderini
Beetles described in 1937